A Home at the End of the World may refer to:
 A Home at the End of the World (novel)
 A Home at the End of the World (film)